Vidracco is a comune (municipality) in the Metropolitan City of Turin in the Italian region of Piedmont, located about  north of Turin.

Vidracco borders the following municipalities: Castellamonte, Issiglio, Vistrorio, and Baldissero Canavese.

Demographic evolution

See also 
 Federation of Damanhur

References

Cities and towns in Piedmont